Herman Hill is a mountain in Bergen County, New Jersey. It is part of the Ramapo Mountains. Herman Hill is part of Ringwood State Park.

References

External links 
 Ringwood State Park

Mountains of Bergen County, New Jersey
Mountains of New Jersey
Ramapos